Vị Thủy is a rural district of Hậu Giang province in the Mekong Delta region of Vietnam.

Districts of Hậu Giang province